Nikolay Ilyich Travkin (born 19 March 1946) is a Russian and former Soviet politician, former member of the Supreme Soviet of the Soviet Union, member of State Duma and member of the Government of the Russian Federation (1994-1996).

In March 1990 he resigned from the Communist Party of the Soviet Union and founded the Democratic Party of Russia.

Awards and decorations
Hero of Socialist Labor (comes with the Order of Lenin, 1986)
Order of the Red Banner of Labour
Order of Merit for the Fatherland (1996)

References

1946 births
Living people
Resigned Communist Party of the Soviet Union members
Heroes of Socialist Labour
First convocation members of the State Duma (Russian Federation)
Second convocation members of the State Duma (Russian Federation)
Third convocation members of the State Duma (Russian Federation)